David Frank Long (born September 6, 1944) is an American football former defensive lineman in the National Football League (NFL) who played seven seasons for the St. Louis Cardinals and the New Orleans Saints. Long played college football at the University of Iowa.

References

1944 births
Living people
People from Jefferson, Iowa
American football defensive linemen
Iowa Hawkeyes football players
St. Louis Cardinals (football) players
New Orleans Saints players
Players of American football from Iowa